The following is a list of highest-grossing Portuguese films at the Portuguese box office. It only includes films released since 2004.


List

References

Portuguese
Highest-grossing